The process of caste-based survey started in Bihar from January 7, 2023. The responsibility of conducting this survey in Bihar has been entrusted to the General Administration Department (GAD) of the government. The Government of Bihar is planning to collect data of every family digitally through a Mobile phone app. Necessary training has already been given to the people involved in this survey. GAD of Bihar has prepared a blueprint for the caste census survey. This census will be done in two phases. There are as many as 204 castes on Bihar government list. According to the list, 22 are to be counted in Scheduled Castes, 32 in Scheduled Tribes, 30 in Backward Classes, 113 in Extremely Backward Classes and 7 in Upper Castes.

The Bihar government issued a notification on June 6, 2022, to conduct a caste survey in Bihar. The Bihar government will spend Rs 500 crore in this work from its contingency fund (Bihar Aakasmikta Nidhi), while 5 lakh employees together will conduct this survey in the entire state. Apart from government employees, Anganwadi workers and Jeevika Didi will also work in this. A target has been set to complete this survey by May 2023.

A portal has been prepared for caste-based enumeration in Bihar. The digital work for caste-based enumeration in Bihar has been entrusted to Delhi-based company Trigene Technology. On 20 January 2023, Supreme Court of India refused to entertain various pleas challenging Bihar Government's notification to conduct caste-based census in Bihar. Chief Minister of Bihar Nitish Kumar said that the exercise is not caste census, instead its a caste survey.

First phase
The first phase of caste-based survey started in Bihar from January 7, 2023, which ended on January 21. The number of all households in the State were counted and recorded in the first phase. The second phase will be calculated on the basis of the data of the first phase. All the data collected in the first phase will now be uploaded on this portal and these data will be available to the enumerators and supervisors at the time of second enumeration on the mobile app. In the first phase, more than two and a half crore families were counted In the first phase of caste census, census workers reached about 2,58,90,497 families across Bihar in 38 districts, which have 534 blocks and 261 urban local bodies and numbered the houses. In the first phase, the name of the head of the family and the number of members living there were recorded. More than 5.18 lakh personnel were engaged in the caste census of the first phase which began on January 7. Survey of 14.35 lakh families was done in Patna district, left out families can give information to District Caste Enumeration Cell.

Second phase
In second phase of the survey, which is to start from April 15 and end on May 15, people living in the households, their castes, sub-castes, socio-economic conditions etc. will be collected. The survey will end on May 31, 2023. In this phase, 26 types of information will be taken from the people. The names of people living outside the state will also be registered.

Survey Report

See also
 Socio Economic and Caste Census 2011
 Demographics of Bihar
 Biharis
 2021 Census of India
 Karnataka Caste Census 2017

References

Censuses in India